The red-chested flufftail (Sarothrura rufa) is a species of bird in the family Sarothruridae.
It is found in sub-Saharan Africa from Liberia to Ethiopia and south to South Africa.

References

External links
 Red-chested flufftail - Species text in The Atlas of Southern African Birds.

Sarothrura
Birds of Sub-Saharan Africa
Birds described in 1819
Taxa named by Louis Jean Pierre Vieillot
Taxonomy articles created by Polbot